Abiriba  pronounced [/E`biriba`/] is an ancient Enuda kingdom in Abia State, in southeastern Nigeria, traditionally an Igbo speaking region. It is in the Ohafia local government area.

History 
The origin of the Abiriba people is not as speculative as the origin of other Igbos of southeastern Nigeria. Historical evidence supports the fact that Abiriba people have common ancestry with the Bahumono, Yakor, Ekoi tribes of cross river basin and the people of Arochukwu. At Ekoi, constant disputes between the seven families under Ukpaghiri prompted the clan to move to Ena and finally to Akpa. However, the Abiriba people found it difficult to settle in Akpa due to several issues with neighbours. Nevertheless, the death of Ukpaghiri led to the movement of Mbiriba and his group to Usukpam. Despite staying there for many years, they were still never at peace with the neighbours.

Abiriba is made up of three main villages: Ameke, Amogudu, Agboji and it operates a monarchical system. It operates on a tripodal system where the Eze of each of the three communities come together to form the Enachioken-in-council with the Eze Ameke as Enachioken on the basis of first among equals. The Paramount Ruler of Abiriba kingdom and the Enachoken of Abiriba, Kalu Kalu Ogbu.

Succession to the throne of Enachioken 
Due to the tradition of the Nde Abiriba, the rule is that the descendants of the founder of Abiriba would rule over the kingdom.

Culture

Okpu Achi tree and its myth 
At the heart of Abiriba —the very centre of the town—is a large, ancient tree "Okpu Achi" (Achi tree). The tree is both symbolic and spiritual and many believe that in the event of its fall, water from Okpu Achi would engulf the entire Abiriba land. Legend also has it that the Ishimokoto River is so mystical that when foreigners tried to leave town with a bottle of water from the river—the bottle broke apart and the water flew miles back to the river.

Ceremony 
"Itu Eye" is a traditional law enactment period in Abiriba kingdom. The ceremony marks the enactment of new laws in the ancient kingdom by the paramount ruler, Enachoken of Abiriba, after which the laws are handed over to an age grade group for enforcement. The ceremony starts with the picking of the palm leaf, Iburu omu, by the Okezie age grade group.

Age Grade 
Age-grade also known as UKE in Abiriba language was structured to ensure a peaceful coexistence in their abode. The age grade with its unique features was introduced in the community such that in the contemporary time, the traditional institution had become the backbone behind probably all the developments in Abiriba.  Thus governance and development of the people have gone on orderly for centuries through this indigenous system (Age-grade) of the people.

Notable people 
Notable people from Abiriba include:

 Uche Jombo Rodriguez (Nollywood Actress), Bourdex Telecom (The first Telecom operator in Nigeria before MTN or GLO).
 Ebitu Ukiwe (The Vice president and former Governor of Lagos State).

References

External links 
Uche, K.O.(2008). The African community life. Lagos: Nelag & company Ltd
Akuma, E.(n.d). The comprehensive history of Abiriba. Unpublished note</ref><ref>Ndukwe, O.R.(2015). Public perception of community policing in Abiriba. Msc Thesis. University of Nigeria,Nsukka
 Newsbearer Weekly Vol. 6. No. 11. July 16, 2007 pages 33 – 37.
 https://web.archive.org/web/20071009102122/http://aciu.org/ourhistory.html
 https://books.google.com.ng/books/about/History_and_Development_of_Abiriba.html?id=vKV6HAAACAAJ&redir_esc=y

 
Ethnic groups in Nigeria
Towns in Abia State
Cities in Abia State